The Italian Catholic diocese of Castellammare di Stabia, on the Bay of Naples, existed until 1986. In that year it became part of the archdiocese of Sorrento-Castellammare di Stabia.

History

Previous to Ursus, present at the Roman synod under Pope Symmachus, in 499, no register was kept of the bishops of this city. Among its bishops were:

Lubentius, present in Rome in 649;
St. Castellus (827);
Palmerio (1196), champion of ecclesiastical rights against Emperor Frederick II;
Giovanni Fonseca (1537), a theologian at the Council of Trent; Ludovico Gravina (1581) and C. Vittorino Maso (1599), theologians and canonists;

In 1818 Pope Pius VII united with this see the diocese of Torre Patria (diocese of Lettere-Gragnano), the ancient Liternum.

Bishops of Castellamare di Stabia

to 1600
...
(ca. 499) : Ursus
...
(600/1–612) : Laurentius
...
(1503–1537) : Pedro Flores (bishop)
(1537–1559) : Juan Fonseca
(1562–1577) : Antonio Lauro
(1581–1591) : Ludovico Majorino, C.R.L.
(1591–1596) : Giovanni Myra (Mira)
(1599–1600) : Vittorino Mansi, O.S.B.

1600 to 1800

(1601–1604) : Jerónimo Bernardo de Quirós, O. Praem.
(1605–1627) : Ippolito Riva, C.R. Theat. 
(1627–1644) : Annibale Mascambruno  
(1645–1651) : Andrea Massa 
(1651–1653) : Clemente Del Pezzo, C.R. 
(1655–1662) : Juan de Paredes, C.R.S.A.
(1662–1676) : Pietro Gambacorta, C.R.
(1676–1678) : Lorenzo Mayers Caramuel, O. de M.
(1678–1680) : Salvatore Scaglione, O. Carm. 
(1682–1683) : Francesco de Mandietta (Mendieta), O.SS.T. 
(1684–1705) : Annibale de Pietropaulo 
(1713–1722) : Biagio de Dura
(1722–1727) : Pietro Savastani, O.F.M. 
(1727–1729) : Tommaso Di Grazia  
(1730–1743) : Tommaso Facoia, C.P.O. 
(1743–1749) : Pio Tommaso Milante, O.P.
(1749–1767) : Giuseppe Coppola, C.Orat. 
(1768–1787) : Tommaso Mazza 
(1792–1800) : Ferdinando Crispo Doria

1800 to 1986

(1800–1818) : Sede vacante 
(1818–1820) : Bernardo Maria della Torre  
(1821–1836) : Francesco Colangelo, C.Orat. 
(1837–1849) : Angelo Maria Scanzano  
(1850–1878) : Francesco Petagna 
(1879–1897) : Vincenzo Maria Sarnelli  Appointed, Archbishop of Naples
(1898–1921) : Michele de Jorio 
(1922–1923) : Uberto Maria Fiodo 
(1925–1936) : Pasquale Ragosta 
(1936–1952) : Federico Emanuel (Emmanuel), S.D.B.
(1952–1966) : Agostino D’Arco 
(1971–1977) : Raffaele Pellecchia 
(1977–1986) : Antonio Zama  Appointed, Archbishop of Sorrento-Castellammare di Stabia)

Archbishops of Sorrento-Castellammare di Stabia

(1989–2012) : Felice Cece 
(2012–present) :  Francesco Alfano

References

Books

  (in Latin)
 
 
 

  (an enthusiastic believer)

Acknowledgment

Former Roman Catholic dioceses in Italy